The FC Basel 1933–34 season was the forty-first season since the club was foundation on 15 November 1893. FC Basel played their home games in the Landhof in the district Wettstein in Kleinbasel. The club chairman Franz Rinderer, who was the president for the third consecutive period.

Overview 
The Austrian trainer Karl Kurz remained trainer for his second season and fellow Austrian Josef Haist was is co-trainer. Kurz was ill with leukaemia and his condition worsened. He died because of his illness during the evening of 26 November 1933, only hours the team's victory in the away game against Blue Stars Zürich. He was 35 years old. Josef Haist then took over the job as head coach.

Basel played a total of 46 matches in their 1933–34 season. 30 of these matches were in the domestic league Nationalliga, four in the Swiss Cup and 12 were friendly matches. Of these 12 friendlies seven were played in the Landhof, three other games were also played in Switzerland and three were played in France. Of the friendly games, seven ended with a victory and four ended with a defeat.

The 1933–34 Nationalliga was reformed. The top division was no longer divided into two groups, but for the first time, all teams were in one group. The second tier league remained with two regional groups. The championship was contested by 16 teams and was played in a double round robin, gaining two points for a victory and one for a draw. The three bottom-placed teams would be relegated. Basel started the season well, winning six of the first nine games, suffering only one defeat. Following the death of trainer Kurz the team was disorientated, losing five of the next seven matches and thus losing contact with the two top teams. Then in March Basel caught their form and improved again to finish their Nationalliga season in fifth position in the table, with 15 victories from the 30 games and 36 points. Servette won the championship with 49 points, three points ahead of Grasshopper Club. Urania Genève Sport, FC Blue Stars Zürich and FC Zürich suffered relegation.

In the 1st principal round of the Swiss Cup Basel were drawn at home against and defeated lower tier Solothurn. In the second round away against Lausanne-Sport winning 3–1 and third round at home against local rivals Nordstern Basel winning by three goals to one. Then in the quarter-final on 4 February 1934 Basel were defeated by Locarno and that fits, timely, completely into the entire picture of the seasons evolution. Grasshopper Club won the cup beating Servette 2–0, thanks to an own goal and a goal from Federico Schott.

Players 
The following is the list of the Basel first team squad during the season 1933–34. The list includes players that were in the squad the day the season started on 6 August 1933 but subsequently left the club after that date.

 

 

Players who left the squad

Results

Legend

Friendly matches

Pre-season

Mid-season

Nationalliga

Matches

Table

Swiss Cup

See also 
 History of FC Basel
 List of FC Basel players
 List of FC Basel seasons

References

Sources 
 Rotblau: Jahrbuch Saison 2014/2015. Publisher: FC Basel Marketing AG. 
 Die ersten 125 Jahre. Publisher: Josef Zindel im Friedrich Reinhardt Verlag, Basel. 
 FCB team 1933–34 at fcb-archiv.ch

External links
 FC Basel official site

FC Basel seasons
Basel